Pseudallescheria is a genus of fungi in the family Microascaceae.

See also
 Pseudallescheriasis

External links
Index Fungorum

Microascales